The twenty-sixth edition of the Caribbean Series (Serie del Caribe) was played in . It was held from February 4 through February 9 with the champion teams from Dominican Republic (Tigres del Licey), Mexico (Cañeros de Los Mochis), Puerto Rico (Indios de Mayagüez) and Venezuela (Águilas del Zulia). The format consisted of 12 games, each team facing the other teams twice. The games were played at Hiram Bithorn Stadium in San Juan, Puerto Rico.

Summary
Águilas del Zulia of the Venezuelan league won the series with a 5–1 record and was managed by Rubén Amaro. RF Leonel Carrión earned the Series MVP award, after hitting a .529 batting average (9-for-17) with five runs, four stolen bases and a .765 slugging percentage. Supporting him on Venezuela were 1B Tito Francona (.333, 5 RBI, .407 SLG), 3B Luis Salazar (.227 BA, .333 OBP, .571 SLG,  three SB) and LF Jerry White (.308 BA, .462 SLG, five RBI). The pitching staff posted a collective .173 ERA and was led by Ron Meredith (1-0, 1.00 ERA, 7 strikeouts, 9 innings), Luis Leal (1-0, 3.00, 13 SO, 9 innings),  Derek Botelho (1-0, .000 ERA, 7 innings) and Kelly Downs (1-0, one save, .311, 6 SO in  innings). Other significant members of the roster included pitchers Porfi Altamirano, Luis Sánchez and Manny Sarmiento; catcher Bobby Ramos; infielders Juan Bustabad, Johnny Paredes, Razor Shines and Manny Trillo, and outfielders Jeff Stone and César Tovar. The team's only defeat came on the final day of the competition, losing 5–4 to Mexico in 13 innings. Five Venezuelan players were included in the All-Star team.

The Mexican entry, led by Vinicio García, finished in second place with a 4-2 mark, and featured big leaguers as Fernando Arroyo (P), Francisco Estrada (C), Jim Lewis (P), Junior Moore (OF) and Aurelio Rodríguez (3B). The Mochis also ended second in batting average (.214) but committed 14 errors for a .945  fielding percentage, which was the worst total among all teams (Dominican Republic, Puerto Rico and Venezuela combined for 13 errors).

Dominican Republic tied with Puerto Rico for last place with a 1-4 record. They tied at 5 in the eighth inning of a game suspended by rain.

The Dominicans, piloted by Manny Mota, finished third in batting average (.208) and fielding percentage (.955). Pascual Pérez (1-0) got their only win, while the top hitter was OF George Bell, who belted the only three home runs of his team to lead the tourney. The Licey team also featured players Pedro Borbón (P), Dámaso García (2B), César Gerónimo (LF), Mark Huismann (P), Howard Johnson (3B), Rafael Landestoy (RF), Alejandro Peña (P), Floyd Rayford (1B), Gilberto Reyes (C), Rafael Santana (2B), Julio Solano (P) and José Uribe (SS).

Puerto Rico, managed by Frank Verdi, led the series in fielding percentage (.975) but finished last in batting average (.192). Pitcher Tom Candiotti won the only game for Mayagüez while first baseman Carmelo Martínez led the attack (2 HR, 5 RBI). Other members of the roster were Juan Agosto (P), Larry Anderson (P), Sid Bream (DH), José Guzmán (P), Dion James (LF), Tom Lawless (2B), Craig Lefferts (P), Ron LeFlore (RF), Candy Maldonado (CF), José Morales (DH), Luis Quiñones (3B) and Dickie Thon (SS).

Scoreboards

Game 1, February 4

Game 2, February 4

Game 3, February 5

Game 4, February 5

Game 5, February 6

Game 6, February 6

Game 7, February 7

Game 8, February 7

Game 9, February 8

Game 10, February 8

Game 11, February 9

Game 12, February 9

 Game was called after eight innings due to rain.

See also
Ballplayers who have played in the Series

Sources
Antero Núñez, José. Series del Caribe. Impresos Urbina, Caracas, Venezuela.
Araujo Bojórquez, Alfonso. Series del Caribe: Narraciones y estadísticas, 1949-2001. Colegio de Bachilleres del Estado de Sinaloa, Mexico.
Figueredo, Jorge S. Cuban Baseball: A Statistical History, 1878 - 1961. Macfarland & Co., United States.
González Echevarría, Roberto. The Pride of Havana. Oxford University Express.
Gutiérrez, Daniel. Enciclopedia del Béisbol en Venezuela, Caracas, Venezuela.

External links
Official site
Latino Baseball
Series del Caribe, Las (Spanish)

Caribbean Series
Caribbean Series
International baseball competitions hosted by Puerto Rico
Sports in San Juan, Puerto Rico
1984 in Puerto Rican sports
1984 in Caribbean sport
Caribbean Series